Devil Dogs is a 1928 American silent comedy film directed by Fred Windemere and starring Pauline Curley and Stuart Holmes. It takes place during World War I.

Cast
 Al Alt as Archie Van Stratten 
 Pauline Curley as Joyce Moore 
 Stuart Holmes as Sgt. Gordon White 
 Ernest Hilliard as Lt. Holmes 
 J.P. McGowan as Capt. Standing

References

Bibliography
 Munden, Kenneth White. The American Film Institute Catalog of Motion Pictures Produced in the United States, Part 1. University of California Press, 1997.

External links

1928 films
1928 comedy films
Silent American comedy films
American silent feature films
1920s English-language films
American black-and-white films
Films directed by Fred Windemere
American World War I films
Films about the United States Marine Corps
1920s American films